This is a list of protected areas of United Arab Emirates:

Abu Dhabi Mangrove and Coastal Wetland Reserve
Ain al Faydah National Park		 
Al Awir Nature Reserve
Al Khawanij Nature Reserve
Al Maha Nature Reserve 
Dubai Desert Conservation Reserve National Park
Hatta Nature Reserve
Jabal Ali Wildlife Sanctuary 
Khor Kalba Nature Reserve 
Marawah Marine Protected Area
Mushrif National Park
Nadd Al Sheba Nature Reserve 
Rams Lagoon Reserve	 
Ras Al Khor Wildlife Sanctuary
Wadi Wurayah National Park		 
Zirkuh Island Bird Sanctuary

References
World Database on Protected Areas - United Arab Emirates

 
United Arab Emirates
Protected areas